Raju Gadu is a 2018 Indian Telugu-language comedy film directed by Sanjana Reddy and produced by AK Entertainments. The film stars Raj Tarun, Amyra Dastur, and Rajendra Prasad with music composed by Gopi Sundar. The film was released on 1 June 2018. Sajid Nadiadwala is developing the Hindi Remake named Pilfer Singh with Reddy as director and Kartik Aaryan and Amyra Dastur as leads.

Plot 
Raju (Raj Tarun) is a kleptomaniac i.e., an impulse to steal without his own knowledge, his father Narayana (Rajendra Prasad) sees his problem in  childhood and takes him to Dr. Saima (Prudhvi Raj) who has pledged to cure it by inventing a new medicine, but is unsuccessful. Due to the disease, Raju has constant breakups with girls, once a college girl Vennela (Pujita Ponnada) warns him not to love any girl, otherwise, she is going to disclose the truth. Thereafter, Raju gets acquainted with beautiful Tanvi (Amyra Dastur), when he starts covering his disease with various funny reasons, thereby winning her love. After a few hilarious incidents, Tanvi's parents (Shiju & Pramodini Pammi) accept their alliance. Now there is a twist in the story, Tanvi's grandfather Suryanarayana (Nagineedu) is the most respected person in the village who hates thieves and punishes them by severing their hands. After entering their village, frightened Raju makes everyone believe that his father has kleptomania. Meanwhile, a terrorist group is in search of Raju as he has stolen their bomb which was to blast for a contract of 100 crores. Meanwhile, Anji (Rao Ramesh) the past servant of Suryanarayana has been ostracized from the village for the theft of temple ornaments. After 25 years, Anji returns as a millionaire to take revenge against Suryanarayana. So, he makes a ploy by again making the theft of the ornaments and indicting Suryanarayana. Here, to protect Suryanarayana's honor, Raju takes the blame, admits the reality regarding his disease when he has been insulted badly and Tanvi starts hating him. Eventually, Anji shakes hand with the terrorists, strikes a deal coincidentally and provides the bomb in Raju's towel. At last, Raju nabs the real culprits proves Anji as a miscreant when everyone understands his virtue and requests his pardon. On the other side, Raju at present steals the triggering device of the terrorists and accidentally activates it by which the entire gang dies in the blast. Finally, in the post-credits Raju again steals the wedding chain, at the time of his marriage and everybody laughs at him.

Cast

Raj Tarun as Raju
Amyra Dastur as Tanvi 
Pujita Ponnada as Vennela
Rajendra Prasad as Narayana, Raju's father
Sithara as Seeta, Raju's mother
Shiju as Tanvi's father
Pramodini Pammi as Tanvi's mother
Nagineedu as Suryanarayana, Tanvi's grandfather
Rao Ramesh	as Anji
Subbaraju as Gopi
Prudhvi Raj as Dr. Saima
Raja Ravindra as Lingaraju
Praveen as Raju's friend
Krishna Bhagavan as Gopi's assistant
Raghu Karumanchi			
Khayyum
Fish Venkat
Shakalaka Shankar

Soundtrack

Music composed by Gopi Sundar. Music released on ADITYA Music Company.

Reception
Srivathsan Nandadur of The Hindu wrote: "Sanjana Reddy’s directorial debut Rajugadu comes with a ‘been there done that’ trope of milking a protagonist’s condition to go on a comic spree. " Nandadur felt that the story lacked a major conflict point. A reviewer from Sify stated that the film failed miserably and added, "It is sad to see even young female directors are treading the path of formulaic stories and screenplays that was paved by outdated male film makers."

Vyas in his review for The Hans India rated the film 2.5 of 5 and wrote: "The film lacks strong scenes and excellent characterizations. The climax is a disappointment too. Though the intention of the film is good, it was not translated well." The Times of India critic Neeshita Nyayapati rated the film 1/5 and called it "stiled and boring."

References

External links
 

2018 films
Indian comedy films
2018 comedy films
Films shot in Hyderabad, India
2010s Telugu-language films
Films scored by Gopi Sundar